John Nelson Le Fevre (1872 – 1957) was a British sports shooter. He competed in the 50 yard free pistol event at the 1908 Summer Olympics.

References

1872 births
1957 deaths
British male sport shooters
Olympic shooters of Great Britain
Shooters at the 1908 Summer Olympics
Place of birth missing